ZEE5 is an Indian on-demand Internet streaming media provider run by Zee Entertainment Enterprises. It was launched in India on 14 February 2018 with content in 12 languages. The service has distributed a number of original programs, including original series, specials, miniseries, documentaries and films.

Feature films

Zee Plex
On 2 October 2020, Zee launched a PVOD and Pay-per-view service called Zee Plex for its streaming service ZEE5, and various DTH services in India.

Indian

International

Short films

Footnotes

References

External links 

 
 

Internet-related lists